A radar is an electronic system used to determine and detect the range of target and maps various types of targets.This is a list of radars.

Argentina

Australia

Brazil

Egypt

Europe

India

Military

Airborne
LCA MMR - 3D advanced, lightweight multimode fire control radar for HAL Tejas Mk1 aircraft derived from EL/M-2032.
 Netra AEW&CS - 3D AESA AEW&C radar installed on an ERJ 145 aircraft.

Naval

XV-2000 3D airborne naval surveillance radar for Dornier 228 maritime patrol aircraft.
Revathi 3D Naval Medium range surveillance radar derived from the 3D CAR for Shivalik-class frigates.

Land-based

Swordfish LRTR - AESA long-range tracking radar for Ballistic missile defence surveillance and fire control.
Arudhra MPR - Static 4D AESA Medium power radar for airspace surveillance for ranges exceeding 300 km.
ADTCR - Mobile 4D AESA Medium power radar for airspace surveillance
Ashwini LLTR - Mobile 4D AESA radar for Low level air targets up to ranges of 200 km. 
INDRA series of 2D Pulse-doppler medium range airspace surveillance radars
Rajendra 3D medium range PESA fire control radar for Akash SAM.
Central Acquisition Radar (3D-CAR) PESA tracking radar for battlefield surveillance as part of the Akash SAM system.
BMFR - Mobile Quad panel AESA multifunction radar for battery level fire control in QRSAM missile system.
BSR - Mobile Quad panel AESA multifunction radar for battery level surveillance in QRSAM missile system.
Atulya ADFCR - AESA fire-control radar for upgraded L70 air defence gun.
BFSR-SR 2D short range battlefield surveillance radar for the Indian Army.
Bharani Low Level Lightweight Radar(LLLR) - portable 2D low level aircraft tracking radar.
Swathi Weapon Locating Radar - Mobile 3D PESA Counter-battery radar.

Under development

Uttam AESA multifunction radar for fighter aircraft.
LR-MFR - Dual panel multifunction radar for naval application.
HPR - Static Quad panel AESA High power radar for airspace surveillance

Iran
Matla-ul-fajr VHF radar system
Kashef 1 & Kashef 2
Alvand
BSR-1
Meraj-4
Asr
Alim
Najm-802
Ghadir
Thamen

Italy

Airborne 
Leonardo S.p.A. Grifo radar
Leonardo S.p.A. SeaSpray radar

Surface based 
 Selex RAT-31DL - 3D long range L-Band Air-Search radar

Military – Naval 
 EMPAR – European Multifunction Phased Array Radar, AN/SPY-790
 KRONOS – 3D multi-mode C-Band radar with a fully solid state active phased array antenna
 Selex RAN-40L – 3D multibeam long range L-Band radar with a fully solid state active phased array antenna

Japan

Surface-based
J/FPS-1
J/FPS-2
J/FPS-3
J/FPS-4
J/FPS-5
J/FPS-7
J/TPS-100
J/TPS-101
J/TPS-102

Naval 
FCS-1 fire control radar
FCS-2 fire control radar
FCS-3 fire control radar
OPS-1
OPS-2
OPS-3
OPS-4
OPS-5
OPS-9
OPS-10
OPS-11
OPS-12
OPS-13
OPS-14
OPS-16
OPS-17
OPS-18
OPS-19
OPS-20
OPS-22
OPS-24
OPS-28
OPS-29
OPS-39
OPS-50
ZPS-1 Submarine radar
ZPS-2 Submarine radar
ZPS-3 Submarine radar
ZPS-4 Submarine radar
ZPS-5 Submarine radar
ZPS-6 Submarine radar

Airborne
J/AWG-11
J/AWG-12
J/APG-1 the first series production AESA to be introduced on a military aircraft in service
J/APG-2
Multi-Function RF Sensor

People's Republic of China

Military

Naval
LR66 Radar fire control radar for CIWS
Type 341 Radar 'RICE LAMP' fire control radar
Type 342 Radar 'FOG LAMP' fire control radar
Type 343 Radar 'WASPHEAD/SUN VISOR' fire control radar
Type 344 Radar fire control radar
Type 345 Radar fire control radar
Type 346 Radar Multifunction naval active phased array radar
Type 347 Radar 'RICE BOWL' fire control radar
Type 348 Radar fire control radar
Type 349 Radar fire control radar
Type 351 Radar 'POT HEAD' surface search radar
Type 352 Radar 'SQUARE TIE' naval surface search radar
Type 354 Radar 'EYE SHIELD' air/surface search
Type 360 Radar air/surface search radar
Type 362 Radar air/surface search radar
Type 363 Radar air/surface search radar
Type 364 Radar air/surface search radar
Type 366 Radar air/surface search radar
Type 381 Radar 'RICE SCREEN' air/surface search radar
Type 382 Radar air/surface search radar
Type 512 Radar navigational/surface search radar
Type 514 Radar air search radar
Type 515 Radar 'BEAN/PEA STICK'air/surface search radar
Type 517 Radar 'KNIFE REST' air/surface search
Type 518 Radar air search radar
Type 707 Radar 'FIN CURVE' navigation radar
Type 723 Radar navigation radar
Type 726 Radar navigation radar
Type 751 Radar navigation radar
Type 752 Radar navigation radar
Type 753 Radar navigation radar
Type 756 Radar navigation radar
Type 757 Radar navigation radar
Type 762 Radar navigation radar
Type 765 Radar navigation radar

Land-based
714XDN Radar metrological
BL904 Counter-battery radar
CLC-1 Radar short range surveillance radar
CLC-2 Radar low altitude surveillance radar
CLC-3 Radar mobile low altitude air defense radar
CLC-8 Radar metrological radar
CS/RB1 Counter-battery radar
CS/RT1 Radar Anti-battery radar
DLD-100A Radar air traffic control radar
HGR-105 Radar surveillance
HK-JM long range meter-wave stealth detection 2-D surveillance radar
HK-JM2 long range meter-wave stealth detection 2-D surveillance radar
DWL002 Passive Sensor passive sensor
HT-223 fire control radar
JH-16 Radar
JH-18 Radar
JY-8 Radar 'WALL RUST' mobile tactical 3D radar
JY-9 Radar 'WALL EYE' low altitude surveillance radar
JY-11 Radar low/medium altitude 3D surveillance radar
JY-14 Radar 'GREAT WALL' medium/long range 3D radar
JY-17 Radar battlefield surveillance radar
JY-21 Radar air traffic control radar
JY-26 Radar Skywatch-U 3D long-range air surveillance radar
JY-27 Radar 'WIDE MAT' long range surveillance radar
JY-30 Radar
JY-50 Radar
JYL-1 Radar long range 3D surveillance radar
JLG-43 Radar height finding radar
JLP-40 Radar surveillance radar
JLP-440E Radar surveillance
LDB08 Radar
LD-JP target designation radar
LD-JX portable solid state pulse-Doppler moving target surveillance radar
LR63 radar
LSS-1 Radar gap filler 2D radar
REL-2A Radar long range air surveillance radar
REL-3 Radar long range air surveillance radar
REL-4 Radar long range air surveillance radar
REL-6B Radar long range air surveillance radar
RES-1 Radar low to medium altitude surveillance radar
REWY-1 Radar long range air surveillance radar
SLC-2 Radar counter battery radar
SLC-7 search radar
Type 120 Radar search radar
Type 305A Radar search radar
Type 305B Radar search radar
SJ-202 Radar engagement
SJ-321 Radar engagement
Type 373 Counter-battery radar
Type 390A Radar surveillance
Type 408C Radar surveillance
Type 514 Radar surveillance
Type 571 Radar surveillance radar
Type 581 Radar air warning radar
Type 701 Radar meteorological radar
Type 704 Radar counter battery radar
Type 791 Radar precision approach radar
Type 825 Radar engagement
YLC-2 Radar 3D surveillance radar
YLC-4 Radar long range surveillance radar
YLC-6 Radar medium and low altitude surveillance radar
YLC-7 Radar
YLC-8 Radar long range surveillance radar
YLC-15 Radar light air defense radar
YLC-18 Radar medium-range low-altitude 3D radar
YLC-20 Passive Sensor passive sensor
YLC-29 Passive Sensor passive detection system
YLC-48 Radar

Airborne
AESA radars from 14th Institute on
KJ2000
KJ500
Y8W
J-20
J-31
AESA radars from 38th Institute on
KJ200
JZY01
Z-18J
Z8AEW
AESA radars from 607th Institute on
J-16
J-15
J-11D
J-10C
PESA radar from 38th Institute on
ZDK03
MMW phased array radar from 10th and 14th Institutes on
WZ-10
Z-19
Type 204 Radar
Type 205 Radar
Type 251 Radar
Type 252 Radar
Type 317 Radar
Type 645 Radar
Type 698 Radar
CASSAR-44 Radar
JD-08 Radar
CWI Radar
Type 232H Radar
MRAIR-1 Radar
YQC-2 Radar
Type 245 Radar long radar surface search
Type 1473 Radar
JL-7 Radar
JL-10A Radar
JY-06 Radar
KJ-1 AEWC 1st gen TU-4 AEWC
KLC-1 Radar lightweight helicopter borne radar
KLJ-1 Radar
KLJ-6 Radar Falcon
KLJ-7 Radar airborne pulse Doppler fire control radar
KLJ-7A Radar
HAL-3 Radar airborne navigation radar
Type 1473 Radar
Type 1475 Radar
Type 1478 Radar
Type 1493 Radar
Type 1495 Radar
Type 1491 Radar

Commercial/scientific
SLC-4 Radar space tracking radar
YLC-1 Radar vehicle borne coherent instrumentation radar

Serbia
P-12 Modernize version with digital function, new carbon antenna in Yagi shape, and higher range up to 350 km.
P-18 Modernize version with new antennas, bigger range, digitalised. 
P-40 Medium-range surveillance and target acquistion
AN/TPS-70 long range 3D radar.
Giraffe radar modernize version, and digital with PASARS anti-aircraft sistem.
H-22 Long-range surveillance and target acquistion.
Marconi S-605/654 Medium-range surveillance	
Marconi S-613 Altitude measurement	
PRV-16B Altitude measurement

Soviet Union/Russia

Military

Naval
Topaz-V MR-320M "Strut Pair", Air/Surface search radar
Fregat MR-700 "Top Steer", 3D search radar
Fregat MR-710 "Top Plate", 3D search radar replacement for Top Steer on Sovremenny-class destroyers
"Top Sail" somewhat similar to "Top Steer" but larger and operating at lower frequency
"Head Net A" 2D air surveillance and surface search. Sometimes used i combination with Top Steer.
Fregat-MA MR-760MA "Top Plate", 3-D air search radar
Voskhod MR-800 "Top Pair", 3D search radar
Volna 3R41 "Top Dome", Fire control/Target acquisition radar

Land-based
A-100 "Kama", Early warning ground control radar
P-3 "Dumbo", Early warning ground control radar.
P-8 "Knife Rest A", Early warning ground control radar.
P-10 "Knife Rest B", Early warning ground control radar.
P-12 "Spoon Rest", Early warning ground control radar.
P-14 "Tall King", Early warning radar.
P-15 "Flat Face A", Surveillance/Target acquisition radar.
P-18 "Spoon Rest D", Early warning radar.
P-19 "Flate Face B", Surveillance/Target acquisition radar.
P-20 "Bar Lock", Early warning ground control radar.
P-30 "Big Mesh", Early warning ground control radar.
P-35 "Bar Lock", Early warning ground control radar.
P-37 "Bar Lock"
P-40 "Long Track", Early warning/Target acquisition radar.
P-70, Early warning radar.
P-80 "Back Net", E-band Early Warning Radar
P-100
Kasta 2E "Flat Face E" Surveillance radars.
PRV-11 "Side Net", Height finding radar
SNR-75 "Fan Song", Fire control/Target acquisition radar
SNR-125 "Low Blow", Fire control/Target acquisition radar
1S91 "Straight Flush", Fire control/Target acquisition radar
30N6 "Flap Lid", Fire control/Target acquisition radar
36D6 "Tin Shield", Surveillance radar
64N6 "Big Bird", Surveillance radar
76N6 "Clam Shell", Low-altitude detection radar
91N6E, Surveillance radar
92N6E, Fire control/Target acquisition radar
96L6E "Cheese Board", All altitude surveillance radar
9S15 "Bill Board A", Surveillance radar
9S19 "High Screen", Sector surveillance radar
9S32 "Grill Pan", Fire control/Target acquisition radar
Azov radar "Flat Twin", ABM radar
Duga "Steel Yard" or "Russian Woodpecker", Over the horizon radar
Dnestr "Hen House", ABM radar
Dnepr "Hen House", ABM radar
Daryal "Pechora", ABM radar
Dunay "Dog House"/"Cat House", ABM radar
Volga, ABM radar
Don 2N "Pill Box", ABM radar
Voronezh, ABM radar
29B6 Container, ABM radar

Airborne
N001 Myech 
N002 Ametist
N006 Ametist
N008 Ametist
N005 Smerch 
N007 Zaslon 
N010 Zhuk 
N011 Bars 
N012
N014
N019 Rubin 
N025 Almaz
N035 Irbis 
N036 Byelka  
Kopyo
FH-01
Osa
RP-21 Sapfir 
Sapfir-23P 
Taifun-M

Taiwan (Republic of China)

United Kingdom

Ground

Radar, GL, No. 1, Mk I – Anti-aircraft gun laying radar
Radar, GL, No. 1, Mk I E/F – Anti-aircraft gun laying radar with elevation finder
Radar, GL, No. 1, Mk II – Anti-aircraft gun laying radar
Radar, AA, No. 2, Marks I through VII were a 1.5 metre wavelength Searchlight Control (SLC) radar known as 'Elsie'. The only difference between these Marks was the mounting arrangement. Marks VIII and IX were centimetric versions that did not see service.

Radar, AA, No 3, Mk 1 – new name for GL Mk. III(C)
Radar, AA, No 3, Mk 2 - new name for GL Mk. III(B)
Radar, AA, No 3, Mk 2 (F) - Anti-aircraft fire control modified for mortar locating.
Radar, AA, No 3, Mk 3  - "Emergency" anti-aircraft fire control known as 'Baby Maggie' adapted from SLC. Also used for mortar locating.
Radar, AA, No 3, Mk 5 – US-made SCR-584 radar Anti-aircraft fire control

Radar, AA, No 3, Mk 7 - Post-war anti-aircraft fire control.
Radar, AA, No 3, Mk 8 - Designation for US-made SCR-545 radar, but not used in service.
Radar, AA, No 4, Mk I - Anti-aircraft local warning, known as 'Zippy'.
Radar, AA, No 4, Mk II - Anti-aircraft local warning.
Radar, AA, No 4, Mk III - Anti-aircraft local warning.
Radar, AA, No 4, Mk V - AMES Type 14 Anti-aircraft local warning, known as 'Gorgonzola'.
Radar, AA, No 4, Mk VI - Canadian-made Anti-aircraft local warning.
Radar, AA, No 4, Mk VII - Anti-aircraft local warning.
Radar, AA, No 5, Mk Ii - AMES Type 11 Anti-aircraft local warning.
Radar, FA, No 1, Mk 1 - Control of artillery fire against ground targets.
Radar, FA, No 1, Mk 2 - Control of artillery fire against ground targets.
Radar, FA, No 2, Mk 1 - Doppler radar used to detect moving ground targets.
Radar, FA, No 3, Mk 1 - Mortar locating.
Radar, FA, No 3, Mk 2 - Mortar locating derived from AN/APS-3.
Radar, FA, No 3, Mk 1- Mortar locating .
Radar, FA No 8 - "Green Archer" mortar locating .
Radar, FA, No 9 - "Robert" long range ground surveillance mounted in Saracen.
Radar, CA, No 1, Mk 3 - Coast Artillery. Transmitter & receiver based on NT271, with displays from CA No 1 Mk1.
Radar, CA, No 1, Mk 4 (F) - Coast artillery fire control modified for use against ground targets.
Radar, FCE, No 7 - Fire control equipment with 2 radars in a single trailer for aiming a L1A1 40/70 AA gun.
Radar, AD, No 10 - "Yellow River" AMES Type 83 target illuminating used with Thunderbird SAGW
Radar, AD, No 11 - Tactical control used with Thunderbird SAGW
Radar, AD, No 12 - Height finder used with Thunderbird SAGW
Radar, FA, No 13 - Tracking and control used with SD 1 drone
Radar, FA, No 14 - ZB298 short range manportable ground surveillance.
Radar, FA, No 15 - Cymbeline mortar locating.
Radar, FA, No 17 - Marconi marine radar mounted in landrover for coastal surveillance
Radar, FA, No 19 - Militarised WF3 meteorological radar used by AMETS
Radar, FA, No 22 - MSTAR
Blindfire - Fire control used with Rapier missile system.
Dagger - Surveillance used with Rapier missile system.
Orange Yeoman – Projected central surveillance system
Type 86 - "Indigo Corkscrew" Bristol Bloodhound air defence missile system.
Type 901 - Naval fire-control for Sea Slug missile.
Type 98 - Long Range Search.
Type 93 - Long Range Search.
Type 101 - Long Range Search.
Type 102 - Long Range Search.
MAMBA - derivative of Ericson ARTHUR artillery locating radar
COBRA (Radar) - trinational high performance full phased array artillery locating radar
Blighter B202 Mk 2 - Man-portable electronic-scanning ground surveillance radar
Blighter B303 - Vehicle-mountable electronic-scanning ground surveillance radar
Blighter Revolution 360 - Vehicle-mountable electronic-scanning ground surveillance radar
Blighter B400 Series - Fixed installation, modular electronic-scanning ground surveillance radar
 AWS II - Fixed installation (and naval installation), surface warning and air and surface target indication

Naval

Type 79 radar
Type 86 radar
Type 262 radar
Type 267 radar
Type 268 radar
Type 271 radar
Type 272 radar
Type 273 radar
Type 274 radar
Type 275 radar
Type 276 radar
Type 277 radar, height finding
Type 279 radar
Type 280 radar
Type 281 radar
Type 282 radar
Type 283 radar
Type 284 radar
Type 285 radar
Type 286 radar
Type 290 radar
Type 291 radar
Type 293 radar
Type 901 radar, Seaslug missile tracking and guidance
Type 965 radar, naval search
Type 984 radar
Type 997 Artisan radar
Type 1007 radar
Type 1022 radar
Type 2007 radar
SharpEye™ solid state radar
SCV radar
 AWS II

Airborne
AI Mark I - prototype air interception radar, produced as Mk. IV
AI Mk. II - prototype used on the Boulton Paul Defiant
AI Mk. III - pre-production type used on the Bristol Blenheim
AI Mk IV - first widely produced air-to-air radar, used on Douglas Havoc and Bristol Beaufighter
AI Mk. VII - prototype centimetric scanning dish AI radar
AI Mk VIII - production centimetric AI radar made by EKCO
AI Mk. IX - centimetric with "lock and follow". problems with production
AI Mk. X - modified American SCR 720 adopted instead of AI Mk IX
AI.17 Post war British Air Interception radar, by Decca codename "Yellow Lemon" used on Gloster Javelin
AI.18 As above but by GEC used on De Havilland Sea Vixen
AI.20 - a.k.a. Green Willow, prototype airborne interception radar
AI.23 Airpass Built by Ferranti
AI.24 Foxhunter for the Panavia Tornado Air Defence Variant.
AIRPASS I - AI.23 combined with gun sight (from "Airborne Interception Radar and Pilot Attack Sight System") as used on English Electric Lightning
AIRPASS II  project name "Blue Parrot", strike radar on Blackburn Buccaneer
 EKCO ARI 5820 for the Hawker Hunter
ASV Mk. II - Wartime air to surface vessel radar
ASV Mk. III - Wartime air to surface vessel radar
ASV Mk. XI - Wartime air to surface vessel radar
ASV Mk. 19 - used on the Fairey Gannet
Blue Fox for the British Aerospace Sea Harrier FRS1
Blue Vixen for the British Aerospace Sea Harrier FA.2
Blue Kestrel - Search Radar
H2S radar - British navigation radar
H2X radar X band bombing and navigational radar nicknamed as Mickey (equivalent to British H2S) by Philco for Boeing B-29 Superfortress Martin PBM-3C/5/5E/5S Mariner, Boeing B-17 Flying Fortress, Consolidated B-24 Liberator PB4Y-2 and Lockheed PV-2 Harpoon
Monica tail warning radar - British WWII
Orange Putter - tail Warning radar fitted to English Electric Canberra and Vickers Valiant.
Red Drover - sideways-looking radar for reconnaissance
Red Steer -  tail warning radar for the Avro Vulcan
Searchwater - maritime surveillance radar
Village Inn - cover name for radar-based Automatic Gun-Laying Turret

United States

Military

Naval
Early S-band RADAR Designations

From February 1943 the US used a universal system to identify radar variants, consisting of three letters and a number, respectively designating platform, type of equipment, function, and version. This system was continued after WWII with multiservice designations being prefixed by 'AN/' for Army-Navy.

BuShips 1943 classifications

Multi-service classifications

Multi-service classification codes according to the Joint Electronics Type Designation System.

Specific radar systems
 AN/BPS-11 Surface search radar, for submarines.
 AN/BPS-15 Surface search radar, for submarines.
 AN/BPS-16 Surface search radar, for submarines.
 AN/SPG-34 Tracking radar for Mark 63 Gun Fire Control System.
 AN/SPG-35 Tracking radar for Mark 56 Gun Fire Control System.
 AN/SPG-49 Illumination and tracking radar associated with RIM-8 Talos fire control system.
 AN/SPG-51 Illumination and tracking radar for Mk74 "Tartar" Guided Missile Fire Control System
 AN/SPG-53 Gunfire control radar.
 AN/SPG-55 Illumination and tracking radar for Terrier Guided Missile Fire Control System.
 AN/SPG-59 Multifunction radar for Typhon combat system. Canceled 1963.
 AN/SPG-60 Illumination and tracking radar.
 AN/SPG-62 Illumination radar for Aegis combat system.
 AN/SPN-35 Precision Approach Radar (PAR), derived from AN/TPN-8
 AN/SPN-41
 AN/SPN-42
 AN/SPN-43
 AN/SPN-44
 AN/SPN-45
 AN/SPN-46
 AN/SPN-50.  Replacement for the AN/SPN-43.  Based on the SPS-77 (Sea Giraffe AMB)
 AN/SPQ-5 Early beam emitting radar for early model Terrier missiles
 AN/SPQ-9 2D surface search radar
 AN/SPQ-10
 AN/SPQ-11 Cobra Judy phased array radar
 AN/SPS-2 Long range height finding radar by General Electric.
 AN/SPS-3 Also known as XDK, 3D target designator/rapid volume search radar jointly developed by MIT Radiation Laboratory and Naval Research Laboratory.
 AN/SPS-4 Surface and low altitude air search radar by Raytheon.
 AN/SPS-6 2D air search radar
 AN/SPS-8 2D height finding radar
 AN/SPS-10 2D surface search radar
 AN/SPS-12 2D air/surface search radar
 AN/SPS-17 2D air search radar
 AN/SPS-29 2D air search radar
 AN/SPS-30 3D air search radar
 AN/SPS-32 Part of SCANFAR system.
 AN/SPS-33 Part of SCANFAR system.
 AN/SPS-37 2D air search radar
 AN/SPS-39 3D air search radar
 AN/SPS-40 2D air search radar
 AN/SPS-41 Navigational radar for small boats.
 AN/SPS-43 2D air search radar
 AN/SPS-46 Navigational radar for small boats by Lavoie Laboratories.
 AN/SPS-48 3D air search radar
 AN/SPS-49 2D air search radar (long ranged)
 AN/APS-51 Successor of AN/APS-46.
 AN/SPS-52 3D air search radar
 AN/SPS-53 Navigational radar by Sperry Corporation.
 AN/SPS-54 Surface search radar by Sperry Corp.
 AN/SPS-55 2D surface search radar
 AN/APS-57 Small boats navigational radar by Ridge Electronics.
 AN/SPS-58 Low altitude 2D air search radar
 AN/SPS-59 Military designation for the LN-66 short-range navigation radar manufactured by Marconi of Canada. In service in many US Navy ships as well as in the SH-2F LAMPS I ASW helicopter.
 AN/SPS-60 Solid state version of AN/APS-53.
 AN/SPS-61 Teledyne-Ryan's entrant into the 1967 emergency missile-detection radar program won by Westinghouse's AN/SPS-58, never went to production.
 AN/SPS-62 Westinghouse's improvement of AN/SPS-58 with nine examples were ordered in 1973 but quickly cancelled, it appears that Westinghouse simply rolled some of AN/SPS-62's features into AN/SPS-58D.
 AN/SPS-63 US designation for Italian 3RM-20H surface search radars by Dynell Electronics.
 AN/SPS-64 Navigation radar, a surface navigation and search radar, made by Raytheon and used both commercially (brand name Mariner's Pathfinder) and by navies worldwide.
 AN/SPS-65 Development of AN/SPS-58 by Westinghouse as a low altitude radar that is part of the Mark 91 Fire Control System for the Sea Sparrow air defense missiles.
 AN/SPS-66 Small boat navigational radar by Raytheon.
 AN/SPS-67 2D surface search radar
 AN/APS-69 Military designation for Raytheon R41X, with a simple slotted-waveguide bar-type antenna, and a 7" colour CRT display.
 AN/ASB-12 Airborne search radar/autonav/bomb director set used by the Navy RA5C Recon. aircraft
 AN/SPS-71 Improved AN/APS-69 with a dielectric dome protector for the antenna and a 10" color CRT control console with more features.
 AN/SPS-72 Raster-scan collision avoidance radar (RASCAR) by Sperry.
 AN/SPS-73(V)18 Next Generation Surface Search Radar (NGSSR) by Ultra Electronics Ocean Systems
 AN/SPS-74 Anti-submarine surface radar by Ultra Electronics 3 Phoenix.
 AN/SPS-75 US designation of TRS-3D radar.
 AN/SPS-76 Long range 3D air/maritime/surface search/surveillance radar by ITT Excelis.
 AN/SPS-77 US designation of Sea Giraffe AMB (Agile Multi-Beam) radar.
 AN/SPW-2 RIM-8 Talos guidance radar
 AN/SPY-1 3D phased array air search radar part of Aegis Combat System
 AN/SPY-2
 AN/SPY-3 3D phased array air search, tracking, and target illumination radar; part of Dual Band Radar
AN/SPY-4 Volume search element of Dual Band Radar
AN/SPY-6 Modular phased array search and tracking radar
AN/SPY-7 Version of Long Range Discrimination Radar adapted for the Aegis system

Land-based
 AN/CPS-1 - Microwave Early Warning (MEW) radar. World's first microwave phased-array antenna.
 AN/FPQ-16 Perimeter Acquisition Radar at Cavalier AFS, North Dakota (an engineering development model was tested at Syracuse)
 AN/FPS-3 search radar
 AN/FPS-4 Height-Finder
 AN/FPS-5 long Range Search Radar
 AN/FPS-6 height finder
 AN/FPS-7 Long Range Search Radar
 AN/FPS-8 Medium Range Search Radar
 AN/FPS-10 medium-range search/height finder Radar (stripped-down version of the AN/CPS-6B)
 AN/FPS-14 Medium-range search Radar
 AN/FPS-16 tracking radar
 AN/FPS-17 detection radar
 AN/FPS-18 Medium-range search Radar
 AN/FPS-19 long-range search radar
 AN/FPS-20  20A, 20B
 AN/FPS-23 fluttar radar
 AN/FPS-24 long range search radar
 AN/FPS-26 height finder radar
 AN/FPS-27 Long Range search radar
 AN/FPS-30 long-range search radar 
 AN/FPS-35 long range search radar
 AN/FPS-41 meteorological radar
 AN/FPS-49 Ballistic Missile Early Warning System (BMEWS) tracking radar
 AN/FPS-49A variant of FPS-49 with different radome for Thule Site J
 AN/FPS-92 variant of FPS-49 with improvements for Clear AFS, Alaska
 AN/FPS-50 BMEWS scanning radar
 AN/FPS-65 General Surveillance Radar
 AN/FPS-77 Storm Detection Radar
 AN/FPS-85 Spacetrack radar
 AN/FPS-95 Cobra Mist radar
 AN/FPS-100
 AN/FPS-106 Storm Detection Radar
 AN/FPS-107 Long Range Search Radar
 AN/FPS-108 Cobra Dane radar
 AN/FPS-113
 AN/FPS-115 PAVE PAWS early warning radar system
 AN/FPS-117 Long Range Solid-State radar
 AN/FPS-118 Over-The-Horizon-Backscatter (OTH-B) radar
 AN/FPS-120, part of the Solid State Phased Array Radar System (replaced BMEWS radars)
 AN/FPS-123(V3), part of the SSPARS (upgraded PAVE PAWS)
 AN/FPS-123(V7), part of the SSPARS (modified PAVE PAWS at Clear AFS)
 AN/FPS-124 unattended Radar (UAR), short range, doppler radar 
 AN/FPS-126, part of the SSPARS
 AN/FPS-129, also called HAVE STARE
 AN/FPS-132 Upgraded Early Warning Radar (UEWR) to upgrade SSPARS
 AN/MPN-1 ground control radar
 AN/MPN-2 ground control radar
 AN/MPN-3 ground control radar
 AN/MPN-5 ground control radar
 AN/MPN-11 ground control radar
 AN/MPN-14 ground control radar
 AN/MPN-26 ground control radar
 AN/MPQ-4 Counter-mortar (Firefinder) Radar (replaced by AN/TPQ-36 & AN/TPQ-37)
 AN/MPQ-14
 AN/MPQ-35 PAR (Pulse Acquisition Radar) high/medium-altitude threat detection radar for MIM-23 Hawk surface-to-air missile system.
 AN/MPQ-64 Sentinel
 AN/MSQ-1 Close Support Control Set for Radar Bomb Scoring (RBS)
 AN/MSQ-1A used for Matador Automatic Radar Control
 AN/MSQ-2 Close Support Control Set for Korean War RBS
 AN/MSQ-39
 AN/MSQ-46 descendant of AN/MSQ-39
 AN/MSQ-77 Bomb Directing Central for Vietnam War ground directed bombing (Combat Skyspot)
 AN/PPS-5A Ground Surveillance Radar
 AN/PPS-15 Ground Surveillance Radar
 AN/TPQ-10 Radar Course Directing Central
 AN/TPQ-36 Firefinder radar
 AN/TPQ-37 Firefinder radar
 AN/TPQ-43 Seek Score
 AN/TPQ-48 Lightweight Counter Mortar Radar
 AN/TPQ-50 Lightweight Counter Mortar Radar
 AN/TPQ-53 Quick Reaction Capability Radar
 AN/TPS-1 Long range search radar
 AN/TPS-22 Long range search radar
 AN/TPS-25 Ground Surveillance Radar (replaced by AN/TPS-58)
 AN/TPS-32 Long range search radar
 AN/TPS-34 Long range search radar
 AN/TPS-37 height-finder radar
 AN/TPS-39 Intrusion Detection, missile sites
 AN/TPS-43 Mobile Tactical 3D Radar
 AN/TPS-43E Mobile Tactical 3D Radar
 AN/TPS-58 Ground Surveillance Radar
 AN/TPS-59 transportable air search radar
 AN/TPS-63 mobile tactical 2D radar
 AN/TPS-72
 AN/TPS-75 transportable 3-dimensional air search radar
 AN/TPS-77 transportable version of the AN/FPS-117 solid state phased array radar
 AN/TPS-80 Ground/Air Task Oriented Radar
 AN/UPS-1 Short range search radar
 SCR-268 Fire-control radar
 SCR-270 Early warning radar
 SCR-527 Early warning radar
 SCR-547 Height finding radar
 SCR-602 Lightweight early warning radar
 SCR-658 Weather balloon tracking radar
 SCR-584 Fire-control radar
 SCR-784 Fire-control radar
 AN/TSQ-81 Bomb Directing Central (transportable version of AN/MSQ-77)
 AN/TSQ-96 Bomb Directing Central (version of AN/TSQ-81 with digital computer)
 Missile Site Radar at the Missile Launch Area of the Stanley R. Mickelsen Safeguard Complex
 Multi-function Array Radar at White Sands Missile Range for Nike Zeus testing 
 ZEUS Acquisition Radar also at WSMR

Airborne

AN/APB Series
 AN/APB-2, bombing radar for Convair B-58 Hustler

AN/APD Series
 AN/APD-1 homing radar for Grumman TBF Avenger
 AN/APD-5  reconnaissance radar
 AN/APD-7  surveillance radar by Westinghouse Electric (1886) for North American RA-5C Vigilante and Grumman OV-1D Mohawk
 AN/APD-8  podded version of side-looking reconnaissance radar for General Dynamics F-111
 AN/APD-10  side-looking mapping radar for McDonnell-Douglas RF-4B/C Phantom II and Lockheed C-130 Hercules
 AN/APD-11  side-looking radar for McDonnell-Douglas RF-4E Phantom II
 AN/APD-12 I band/J band side-looking reconnaissance radar for Israeli McDonnell-Douglas RF-4B Phantom II
 AN/APD-13  reconnaissance radar that is part of Quick Look SIGINT for Beechcraft RC-12 Guardrail
 AN/APD-14  SAROS (Synthetic Aperture Radar for Open Skies) by Sandia National Laboratories for Boeing OC-135

AN/APG Series
 AN/APG-1 S band interception radar for Northrop P-61 Black Widow
 AN/APG-2 S band interception radar for Northrop P-61B Black Widow
 AN/APG-3 General Electric tail gun aiming radar for Boeing B-29 Superfortress and Convair B-36B
 AN/APG-4 L band low altitude torpedo release / aiming radar for Grumman TBM Avenger  with nickname of  Sniffer.
 AN/APG-5 S band ranging / gun aiming radar for Boeing B-17 Flying Fortress, Consolidated B-24 Liberator and North American F-86A Sabre
 AN/APG-6 L band low altitude bombing radar nicknamed Super Sniffer. Improved AN/APG-4.
 AN/APG-7  Bombing radar to control glide bombs
 AN/APG-8 S band turret gun aiming radar for Boeing B-29B Superfortress
 AN/APG-9 L band low altitude bombing radar. Improved AN/APG-6
 AN/APG-11 L band bombing radar
 AN/APG-12 L band low altitude bombing radar. Improved AN/APG-9
 AN/APG-13 General Electric 75 mm nose gun aiming radar for North American B-25H Mitchell.
 AN/APG-14 S band gun aiming radar for Boeing B-29 Superfortress
 AN/APG-15 S band tail gun aiming radar for Boeing B-29B Superfortress and Consolidated PB4Y Privateer
 AN/APG-16  improved AN/APG-2 gun aiming radar for B-32.
 AN/APG-17  improved AN/APG-4 L band low altitude torpedo release / aiming radar and bombing radar
 AN/APG-18 X band gun aiming radar by Glenn L. Martin Company for turret guns, improved AN/APG-5
 AN/APG-19 X band gun aiming radar by Glenn L. Martin Company  improved AN/APG-8 and AN/APG-18.
 AN/APG-20 L band low altitude bombing radar. Improved AN/APG-12
 AN/APG-21  ranging radar for ground attack
 AN/APG-22 X band gun aiming radar by Raytheon
 AN/APG-23  Fire control radar for Convair B-36A
 AN/APG-24  Fire control radar for Convair B-36B
 AN/APG-25 X band gun aiming radar for North American F-100 Super Sabre
 AN/APG-26 Westinghouse Electric (1886) fire control radar for Douglas F3D Skyknight
 AN/APG-27  Gun aiming radar for tail guns of Convair XB-46 and Martin XB-48
 AN/APG-28  Interception radar for North American F-82 Twin Mustang
 AN/APG-30 Sperry Corporation X band fire control radar for North American B-45 Tornado Boeing B-47 North American F-86E/F Sabre North American F-100 Super Sabre Republic F-84E Thunderjet Vought F-8A Crusader McDonnell-Douglas F-4E Phantom II & others
 AN/APG-31 Raytheon gun aiming radar for Martin B-57 Canberra
 AN/APG-32 General Electric X band tail gun aiming radar for Convair B-36D/F and Boeing B-47E Stratojet
 AN/APG-33 Hughes Aircraft X band fire control radar for Northrop F-89A Scorpion Lockheed F-94A/B Starfire
 AN/APG-34  gun aiming radar for Lockheed F-104C Starfighter
 AN/APG-35  fire control radar for Douglas F3D Skyknight
 AN/APG-36  fire control radar for McDonnell F2H-2N Banshee and North American F-86D Sabre
 AN/APG-37 Hughes Aircraft fire control radar for McDonnell F2H-4 Banshee and North American F-86D/K/L Sabre
 AN/APG-39  gun aiming radar for Boeing B-47E Stratojet
 AN/APG-40 Hughes Aircraft fire control radar for Northrop F-89D Scorpion, Lockheed F-94C Starfire and Avro Canada CF-100
 AN/APG-41 General Electric tail gun aiming radar for Convair B-36H
 AN/APG-43 Raytheon continuous wave interception radar
 AN/APG-45 General Electric miniaturized AN/APG-30 for maritime patrol aircraft
 AN/APG-46  original fire control radar of Grumman A-6A Intruder.
 AN/APG-50 F-4 Phantom II fire control radar
 AN/APG-51 Hughes Aircraft interception radar for McDonnell F3H-2 Demon Douglas F3D Skyknight
 AN/APG-53 Stewart-Warner fire control radar for Douglas A-4 Skyhawk
 AN/APG-55 Westinghouse Electric (1886) pulse Doppler interception radar
 AN/APG-56  improved AN/APG-30 for North American F-86 Sabre
 AN/APG-57 Gould Electronics fire control radar
 AN/APG-59 Westinghouse Electric (1886) pulse-Doppler radar for F-4J  part of AN/AWG-10
 AN/APG-60  Doppler radar that is part of AN/AWG-11 for F-4K
 AN/APG-61  fire control radar for F-4M  part of AN/AWG-12
 AN/APG-63  for the F-15 Eagle
 AN/APG-64  development of AN/APG-63  never went into production
 AN/APG-65  for the F/A-18 Hornet
 AN/APG-66  for the F-16 Falcon
 AN/APG-67 General Electric X band multimode pulse-Doppler radar for F-20 Tigershark, AIDC F-CK-1 Ching-kuo and T-50 Golden Eagle
 AN/APG-68  for the F-16 Falcon
 AN/APG-69  improved AN/APQ-159 fire control radar by Emerson Electric Company for Northrop F-5 upgrade
 AN/APG-70  for the F-15 Eagle
 AN/APG-71  for the F-14D Tomcat
 AN/APG-73  for the F/A-18 Hornet
 AN/APG-74  Norden Systems pod-mounted airborne radar
 AN/APG-76  Norden Systems multimode Ku band pulse-Doppler radar for F-4 Phantom II upgrade
 AN/APG-77  for the F-22 Raptor
 AN/APG-78  millimetre wave Long Bow fire control radar for AH-64D Apache Longbow
 AN/APG-79  for the F/A-18E/F Super Hornet
 AN/APG-80  for the F-16E/F Block 60 Desert Falcon
 AN/APG-81  for the F-35 Lightning II
 AN/APG-82  for the F-15E Strike Eagle upgrades, originally proposed as AN/APG-63(V)4
 AN/APG-83 Northrop Grumman AESA radar for F-16 Falcon upgrades
 AN/APG-84 Raytheon AESA radar for F-16 Falcon upgrades

AN/APN Series
 AN/APN-12  rendezvous radar for B-47 and C-97
 AN/APN-24  navigational radar set
 AN/APN-34  ranging radar used in C-97C R6D-1
 AN/APN-50  navigational radar by Sperry Corporation
 AN/APN-52  navigational radar set
 AN/APN-56  navigational radar by Gould Electronics
 AN/APN-58  improved AN/APN-50 navigational radar by Sperry Corporation
 AN/APN-59  improved AN/APN-58 navigational radar by Sperry Corporation for the C-130 C-135 B-57 C-133 C-141 KC-97
 AN/APN-66  Doppler navigational radar on SM-62 missile and B-47
 AN/APN-67 Doppler navigational radar set for P6M-1 NC-121 "Project Magnet" and USN helicopters
 AN/APN-75 rendezvous radar for B-47
 AN/APN-76 rendezvous radar; manufactured by Olympic; used in KC-97 B-47B/E
 AN/APN-77 Doppler radar set in SZ-1B, USN helicopters
 AN/APN-78 Doppler radar set for helicopters
 AN/APN-79 Doppler radar set by Teledyne for helicopters
 AN/APN-81 Doppler radar set for RB/WB-66 WB-50 C-130 and KC-135
 AN/APN-82 improved AN/APN-81 (with integration of AN/ASN-6); for EB/RB/WB-66 and KC-135
 AN/APN-85 navigation radar by Hazeltine Corporation
 AN/APN-89 Doppler radar set for B-52E/G/H  part of AN/ASQ-38
 AN/APN-90 Doppler radar set
 AN/APN-92 navigational radar
 AN/APN-96 Doppler radar set
 AN/APN-97 improved AN/APN-79 Doppler radar set by Teledyne for UH-2A SH-3 SH-34J
 AN/APN-99 improved AN/APN-82 Doppler navigational radar set (with AN/ASN-6 replaced by AN/ASN-7) for B-52 AC-130A and KC-135
 AN/APN-101 airborne radar for RF-4C/F-4E
 AN/APN-102 Doppler radar set by Gould Electronics for RB-47/WB-47E RB-57F/WB-57F F-100C/F RF-101
 AN/APN-105 all-weather Doppler navigational radar system by LFE for F-105B/D and T-39B
 AN/APN-107 navigational radar for RB-57D
 AN/APN-108 improved AN/APN-89 Doppler radar set (with gyro components from AN/APN-81 for B-52E)
 AN/APN-110 Doppler navigational radar set for B-58 F-100D/F RF-101
 AN/APN-113 Doppler radar for B-58  part of AN/ASQ-42
 AN/APN-115 Navigational radar by General Electric
 AN/APN-116 Doppler radar set
 AN/APN-118 Doppler navigational radar set
 AN/APN-119 Doppler navigational radar set
 AN/APN-122 Doppler navigation radar set for S-2 A-2 A-3 A-4 RA-5C A-6 C-47 C-54 EC-121 E-2  TF-8, P-2 P-3 P5M
 AN/APN-126 Doppler radar set
 AN/APN-127 collision warning radar
 AN/APN-128 development of AN/APN-97 navigational radar by Teledyne for C-130
 AN/APN-129 improved AN/APN-128 Doppler navigational radar system by Teledyne for OV-1A/B
 AN/APN-130 improved AN/APN-129 Doppler radar by Teledyne for UH-2A SH-3 SH-34J and CH-53D
 AN/APN-131 Doppler navigational radar for F-105 T-39B  TF-8A
 AN/APN-141 Low altitude radar altimeter manufactured by Bendix; used in A-4/TA-4, A-6, A-7, C-2, C-130, C-141, E-2C, F-4, F-8, F-104, F-105, P-3, S-2, T-39, SH-3
 AN/APN-142 Navigational radar for F-4C
 AN/APN-144 Doppler navigational radar for EC-121 and VC-137
 AN/APN-147 Doppler navigational radar system Canadian Marconi Company for AC-119 C-124C C-130, WC-130B/E RC-135A WC-135B/C-135F and C-141
 AN/APN-148 Doppler navigational radar for F-105D/F
 AN/APN-149 terrain avoidance radar developed by Texas Instruments for TF-8
 AN/APN-153 Doppler navigational radar for A-6 A-4 EA-6 A-7 C-130G E-2 P-3A S-2E
 AN/APN-158 Weather radar Rockwell Collins for HC-123B  U-8F, U-21A and CV-2
 AN/APN-161 improved AN/APN-59 navigational radar with high-resolution mapping capability incorporated by Sperry Corporation for C-130
 AN/APN-162 navigational radar manufactured by Marconi Electronic Systems
 AN/APN-163 Doppler navigational radar system
 AN/APN-165 Terrain-following/ground-mapping radar by Texas Instruments for OV-1 Mohawk
 AN/APN-168 Doppler radar by Marconi Electronic Systems used with AN/AYA-3; used in CH-53A and OV-1 Mohawk
 AN/APN-169 station-keeping radar by Sierra, for the C-130 and C-141
 AN/APN-170 terrain following radar by General Dynamics for A-4C B-52 and B-58
 AN/APN-172 improved AN/APN-168 Doppler radar set by Marconi Electronic Systems; used with AN/ASN-73 for HH-53C, CH-53G
 AN/APN-174 station-keeping subsystem radar set by Teledyne for CH-46 and CH-53
 AN/APN-175 Doppler radar set by Canadian Marconi Company for C-130 CH-3B, HH-3E and MH-53
 AN/APN-178 navigational radar by Sierra for C-130
 AN/APN-179 Doppler navigational radar by Bendix Corporation for EC-47
 AN/APN-182 improved AN/APN-130 Doppler navigational radar system by Teledyne used with AN/AYK-2 for SH-3H CH-46, HH-46A/D SH-2D, UH-2C  and RH-53
 AN/APN-185 Doppler navigational radar by Singer Corporation for FB-111A A-7D and B-1A
 AN/APN-186 Doppler radar system for A-6  part of ILAAS (AN/ASQ-116)
 AN/APN-187 improved AN/APN-185 Doppler navigational radar by Singer Corporation for P-3 Orion
 AN/APN-189 development of AN/APN-172 Doppler navigation radar by Canadian Marconi Company for F-111D
 AN/APN-190 improved AN/APN-185 Doppler radar by Singer Corporation for A-7 AC-130E F-111
 AN/APN-195 nose-mounted radar by Rockwell Collins for SH-3D, HH-3E
 AN/APN-196 Doppler radar for F-105
 AN/APN-202 airborne carrier landing radar system for C-2 Greyhound S-3 Viking F/A-18 AV-8  and used in conjunction with AN/SPN-46 on board aircraft carrier
 AN/APN-205 improved AN/APN-182 Doppler radar by Teledyne for SH-2 SH-60B
 AN/APN-206 Doppler radar set for B-1A
 AN/APN-208 development of AN/AON-189 Doppler navigational radar by Canadian Marconi Company for HH-53H  and Bell 412
 AN/APN-210 development of AN/APN-190 Doppler radar set by Singer Corporation for CH-53G
 AN/APN-211 improved AN/APN-205 navigational radar by Teledyne for helicopters
 AN/APN-215 improved AN/APN-179 weather and navigational radar by Bendix Corporation used in RU-38A, U-21 and C-130
 AN/APN-217 improved AN/APN-211 Doppler navigational radar system by Teledyne for AH-1W, UH-1N, SH-2G, SH-3D, HH-3F CH-46 CH-53E, MH-53E, RH-53D HH-60H/J SH-60B/F/J V-22
 AN/APN-218 development of AN/APN-218 Doppler radar navigation system by Teledyne for B-1B B-52G/H KC-135 C-130 and F-111G 
 AN/APN-220 development of AN/APN-218 Doppler radar by Teledyne
 AN/APN-221 development of AN/APN-208 Doppler radar by Canadian Marconi Company for C-141 and HH-53H, MH-53J
 AN/APN-227 Doppler radar sensor by Canadian Marconi Company for P-3C
 AN/APN-230  improved AN/APN-220 Doppler navigational radar by Teledyne for B-1B
 AN/APN-231  derivative AN/APN-230 Doppler navigation radar system by Teledyne for EA-6A
 AN/APN-233 improved AN/APN-230 Doppler navigational radar by Teledyne for C-2 Greyhound OV-10D CH-47 S-2 Alpha Jet and DHC-5
 AN/APN-234 improved AN/APN-215 weather and navigational radar (Model RDR-1400C) by Bendix Corporation for P-3 Orion and C-2 Greyhound
 AN/APN-235 improved AN/APN-221 Doppler navigational radar set by Marconi Electronic Systems for HH-60A
 AN/APN-236 development of AN/APN-233 Doppler radar system by Teledyne
 AN/APN-237 Ku band terrain-following radar by Texas Instruments  part of AN/AAQ-13
 AN/APN-239 improvement of AN/APN-234 weather and navigational radar (Model RDR-1400C) Bendix Corporation for HH-60G, MH-60G
 AN/APN-240 improved AN/APN-169 station keeping radar system by Sierra Research
 AN/APN-241 weather and navigational radar by Westinghouse Electric (1886) for C-130H/J C-27J  and HS-748 (Australia)
 AN/APN-242 improved AN/APN-59 weather and navigational radar by Sperry Corporation
 AN/APN-243 improved AN/APN-243 station-keeping radar by Sierra Technologies; for C-17 and C-130J
 AN/APN-244 E-TCAS (Enhanced Traffic Alert Collision Avoidance System) by Bendix Corporation radar for C-130E/H/J
 AN/APN-245 improved AN/APN-202 ACLS (Automatic Carrier Landing System) radar for F/A-18  used in conjunction with AN/SPN-46 on board aircraft carrier

AN/APQ Series
 AN/APQ-5  low altitude bombing radar by Western Electric for B-24 Liberator B-25 Mitchell PBJ PBM Mariner and B-32 Dominator
 AN/APQ-7 X band bombing radar by Western Electric for B-17 Flying Fortress B-24 Liberator B-25J B-29 Superfortress and B-32 Dominator  nicknamed Eagle Mk 1
 AN/APQ-10 X band high altitude bombing radar by Western Electric for B-29 Superfortress  nicknamed Eagle Mk 2
 AN/APQ-11  torpedo aiming radar, previously known as SCR-626
 AN/APQ-12  bombing and torpedo aiming radar, previously known as SCR-631
 AN/APQ-13 X band bombing radar by Western Electric for B-29 Superfortress and B-32 Dominator  nicknamed Mickey
 AN/APQ-14  airborne radar nicknamed as Moth-1
 AN/APQ-16  airborne bombing radar
 AN/APQ-19 S band search and navigational radar
 AN/APQ-23 X band high altitude bombing radar for B-29 Superfortress
 AN/APQ-24  bombing and navigational radar for B-36B B-45A B-50 Superfortress  and B-66B  designated as K-1 System
 AN/APQ-31  bombing and navigational radar
 AN/APQ-34 K band bombing radar by Western Electric
 AN/APQ-35 X band search and attack radar by Westinghouse Electric (1886) for F3D Skyknight F3H Demon and F2H Banshee
 AN/APQ-36  improved AN/APQ-35 radar by Westinghouse Electric (1886) for F3D-2M and F7U Cutlass
 AN/APQ-39  Weather and navigational radar on board B-52 Stratofortress
 AN/APQ-41  improved AN/APQ-36 by Westinghouse Electric (1886) for F3D-2 and F2H-3
 AN/APQ-43  airborne radar exported to UK with British designation AI-22 for Javelin FAW.2 to FAW.6
 AN/APQ-46  cancelled airborne radar for the proposed F3D-3
 AN/APQ-50  improved AN/APQ-41 radar by Westinghouse Electric (1886) for F-4 Phantom II F3H Demon and F4D Skyray
 AN/APQ-51 X band missile control radar by Sperry Corporation for F3H Demon and F7U Cutlass
 AN/APQ-54  airborne projectile velocity measuring radar
 AN/APQ-55 K band side looking radar for RF-4C
 AN/APQ-56  side looking aperture radar by Westinghouse Electric (1886) for RB-57 and RB-47
 AN/APQ-57  millimetre wave navigational radar
 AN/APQ-58  millimetre wave navigational radar
 AN/APQ-59  improved AN/APQ-56 side looking radar by Westinghouse Electric (1886)
 AN/APQ-60  missile illumination radar by Raytheon for semi-active radar homing missiles
 AN/APQ-62  side looking radar
 AN/APQ-64 Sparrow II missile control radar for F5D Skylancer
 AN/APQ-65  interception radar exported to France for French built de Havilland Vampire
 AN/APQ-67  interception radar by Raytheon
 AN/APQ-69  podded version of side-looking aperture radar by Hughes Aircraft for B-58 Hustler
 AN/APQ-70  millimetre wave navigational radar
 AN/APQ-72  improved AN/APQ-50 by Westinghouse Electric (1886) for F-4 Phantom II
 AN/APQ-73  side-looking radar for RS-70
 AN/APQ-74 X band missile control radar
 AN/APQ-81  Doppler navigational radar by Northrop Corporation for F6D Missileer and A-3 Skywarrior
 AN/APQ-83  airborne radar by Magnavox for F-8D
 AN/APQ-84  improved AN/APQ-83 radar by Magnavox for F-8 Crusader
 AN/APQ-86 K band side-looking radar by Texas Instruments for RU-8D
 AN/APQ-88  airborne radar by Naval Avionics for YA-6A
 AN/APQ-89 terrain-following radar tested on T-2 Buckeye by Texas Instruments
 AN/APQ-92 Ku band search and attack radar by Norden for A-6A
 AN/APQ-93  synthetic aperture mapping radar
 AN/APQ-94  improved AN/APQ-84 fire control radar by Magnavox for F-8D/E
 AN/APQ-95  collision avoidance radar for helicopters
 AN/APQ-96  airborne radar for OV-10A
 AN/APQ-97 K band side-looking radar by Westinghouse Electric (1886) for OV-1A
 AN/APQ-99 J band multi-mode radar by Texas Instruments for A-7A RF-4B/C and RF-101
 AN/APQ-100  improved AN/APQ-72 radar by Westinghouse Electric (1886) for F-4C
 AN/APQ-101 terrain-following radar by Texas Instruments
 AN/APQ-102  side-looking mapping radar by Goodyear Tire and Rubber Company for RB-57 and RF-4C
 AN/APQ-103  improved AN/APQ-92 radar by Norden for A-6B
 AN/APQ-104  derivative of AN/APQ-94 radar by Magnavox for F-8E(FN)
 AN/APQ-108  reconnaissance radar by Conductron Corporation for SR-71 Blackbird
 AN/APQ-109  fire control radar by Westinghouse Electric for F-4D
 AN/APQ-110 Ku band terrain-following radar by Texas Instruments for General Dynamics F-111 and RF4-C
 AN/APQ-112  improved AN/APQ-103 radar by Norden A-6C
 AN/APQ-113 Ku band search and attack radar by General Electric for General Dynamics F-111
 AN/APQ-114  improved AN/APQ-113 Ku band search and attack radar by General Electric for General Dynamics F-111 and F-4 Phantom II
 AN/APQ-115  improved AN/APQ-110 terrain-following radar by Texas Instruments for A-7A General Dynamics F-111 RF-4C and C-130E
 AN/APQ-116  improved AN/APQ-115 terrain-following radar by Texas Instruments for A-7A/B/C and C-130 Hercules
 AN/APQ-117  improved AN/APQ-109 by Westinghouse Electric (1886) for F-4D/E
 AN/APQ-118 terrain-following radar by Norden for HH-53 and AH-56 Cheyenne
 AN/APQ-119  improved AN/APQ-114 by General Electric for F-111A/D
 AN/APQ-120  solid state fire control radar by Westinghouse Electric (1886) for F-4E/F/G
 AN/APQ-122 X band multi-mode radar by Texas Instruments for C-130 Hercules Boeing RC-135 Boeing T-43  and Boeing E-4
 AN/APQ-123  airborne radar for F-111D
 AN/APQ-124  improved AN/APQ-94 fire control and ranging radar by Magnavox for F-8J
 AN/APQ-125  improved AN/APQ-125 Doppler ranging and fire control radar by Magnavox for F-8J
 AN/APQ-126  improved AN/APQ-116 J band terrain-following radar by Texas Instruments for A-7D/E AC-130 and CH-53 Sea Stallion
 AN/APQ-127  airborne radar by Sperry Corporation for A-6 Intruder
 AN/APQ-128 J band terrain-following radar by Sperry Corporation for F-111C/D and A-7D/E
 AN/APQ-129  derivative of AN/APQ-112 radar for EA-6A
 AN/APQ-130  attack radar by Rockwell International for F-111D
 AN/APQ-131  targeting radar by Texas Instruments for OP-2E
 AN/APQ-133  side-looking radar by Motorola for AC-119K and AC/C-130
 AN/APQ-134 Ku band terrain-following radar by Texas Instruments for F-111A/FB-111A
 AN/APQ-135  sink-rate radar on board A-4 Skyhawk F-4 Phantom II F-8 Crusader  and C-130 Hercules
 AN/APQ-136  attack radar by Texas Instruments for AC-119K and AC-130A
 AN/APQ-139 Ku band multi-mode radar by Texas Instruments for B-57G
 AN/APQ-140 J band multi-mode radar by Raytheon Intelligence and Information Systems for Boeing RC-135
 AN/APQ-141 terrain-following radar by Texas Instruments for HH-53 and AH-56 Cheyenne
 AN/APQ-142  Quick Look 1 airborne surveillance radar for RV-1C
 AN/APQ-144  improved AN/APQ-119 by Texas Instruments for F-111F/FB-111A
 AN/APQ-145 Stewart-Warner ranging and mapping radar for A-4E/F/N/S/SU
 AN/APQ-146  improved AN/APQ-134 Ku band terrain-following radar by Texas Instruments for F-111C/F
 AN/APQ-147 terrain-following radar by Texas Instruments for initial batch of MH-60K
 AN/APQ-148  improved AN/APQ-112 J band attack and navigational radar by Norden for A-6E
 AN/APQ-149  fire control and navigational radar for F-8 Crusader
 AN/APQ-150  beacon tracking radar for AC-130E/H
 AN/APQ-152  mapping radar by Goodyear Tire and Rubber Company for RC-130
 AN/APQ-153 Emerson Electric Company fire control radar for Northrop F-5
 AN/APQ-154  improved AN/APQ-141 terrain-following radar by Texas Instruments for HH-53
 AN/APQ-155  attack radar by Norden for B-52H
 AN/APQ-156  improved AN/APQ-148 J band attack radar by Norden for A-6E
 AN/APQ-157  AN/APQ-153 radar with dual line-replaceable units (with the exception of the radar antenna) for the twin seater versions of Northrop F-5
 AN/APQ-158  for the MH-53 Pave Low helicopter
 AN/APQ-159  improved AN/APQ-153 fire control radar by Emerson Electric Company for Northrop F-5
 AN/APQ-160  attack radar for EF-111A Raven
 AN/APQ-161 General Electric attack radar for F-111F
 AN/APQ-162  improved AN/APQ-99 terrain-following radar for RF-4C
 AN/APQ-163  attack radar by General Electric for B-1A
 AN/APQ-164 I band pulse-Doppler multimode radar by Westinghouse Electric (1986) for the B-1 Lancer bomber
 AN/APQ-165  attack radar by Texas Instruments for F-111C
 AN/APQ-166  attack radar for B-52G/H
 AN/APQ-167  improved AN/APG-157 by Emerson Electric Company to upgrade Northrop F-5 twin seater versions, but instead used on Cessna T-47A Citation for radar operator training
 AN/APQ-168  multi-mode radar by Texas Instruments for HH-60D & MH-60K
 AN/APQ-169  improved AN/APG-165 J band attack radar by General Electric for F-111C
 AN/APQ-170 terrain-following radar by Emerson Electric Company for MC-130H
 AN/APQ-171  improved AN/APG-146 terrain-following radar by Texas Instruments for F-111C/F
 AN/APQ-172  improved AN/APQ-162 terrain-following radar for RF-4C
 AN/APQ-173  derivative of AN/APQ-148 radar for the proposed A-6F/G
 AN/APQ-174  for the MH-60K and MH-47E helicopters
 AN/APQ-175 X band / Ku band multimode radar by Emerson Electric Company for C-130E
 AN/APQ-180  derivative of AN/APG-70 radar for the AC-130U gunship
 AN/APQ-181 J band synthetic aperture radar for the B-2 Spirit bomber
 AN/APQ-183  multi-mode radar for RQ-3A.
 AN/APQ-186, improved AN/APQ-174 by Raytheon for CV-22

AN/APS Series
 AN/APS-1 X band radar tail warning radar
 AN/APS-2 S band search radar used with AN/APQ-5 for North American PBJ-1 PBM-5S Consolidated PB4Y-2 Privateer
 AN/APS-3 X band search and bombing radar for PBJ-1 Consolidated PBY-6A Catalina Grumman TBM-1D/3E Lockheed PV-1 Ventura Lockheed PV-2 Harpoon and North American P-82F Twin Mustang
 AN/APS-4 X band intercept radar by Western Electric for Douglas C-47 Skytrain Douglas C-117 North American P-82D/F/H Twin Mustang Vought F4U-4E Corsair Grumman F6F-3E/5E Hellcat Curtiss SB2C-5 Helldiver and Grumman TBF-3 and TBM-3S Avenger
 AN/APS-5 improved AN/APS-4 intercept radar by Western Electric Vought F4U-4N Corsair
 AN/APS-6 intercept radar by Sperry Corporation for McDonnell F2H-2N Banshee North American F-82D Twin Mustang Grumman F6F-3N/5N Hellcat Grumman F7F-4N Tigercat Grumman F8F-1N/2N Bearcat and Vought F4U-4N/5N Corsair
 AN/APS-7 tail warning radar by Westinghouse Electric (1886)
 AN/APS-8 maritime search radar in wingtip pod for Lockheed P-2E Neptune
 AN/APS-9 search radar for Ryan FR-1N Fireball
 AN/APS-10 X band search radar
 AN/APS-11 tail warning radar
 AN/APS-12 fire control radar
 AN/APS-13 tail warning radar for Northrop P-61 Black Widow North American P-82D Twin Mustang and North American PBJ-1
 AN/APS-14 gun aiming radar for Boeing B-17 Flying Fortress and Consolidated B-24 Liberator
 AN/APS-15 H2X 10 GHz/X band bombing and navigational radar nicknamed as Mickey (equivalent to 3 GHz frequency British H2S) by Philco for Boeing B-29 Superfortress Martin PBM-3C/5/5E/5S Mariner Boeing B-17 Flying Fortress Consolidated B-24 Liberator Consolidated PB4Y-2 Privateer and Lockheed PV-1 Ventura, unlike the British H2S radar; H2X could not be detected by Germany's FuG 350 Naxos night fighter receiver
 AN/APS-16 L band tail warning radar
 AN/APS-17 S band tail warning radar
 AN/APS-18 early warning radar
 AN/APS-19 X band search and intercept radar by Sperry Corporation for McDonnell F2H-2N Banshee Vought F4U-5N Corsair Grumman F7F-4N Tigercat and Grumman F8F-1N Bearcat
 AN/APS-20 S band search and early warning radar by Hazeltine Corporation and General Electric for Grumman TBM-3W Avenger, Boeing PB-1W, Lockheed EC-121, ZPG-2W(EZ-1), Grumman AF-2W Guardian, HR2S-1W, Lockheed P-2 Neptune, Boeing WB-29 Superfortress, Lockheed RC-121C, Fairey Gannet AEW.3, Canadair CP-107 Argus, Lockheed WP-3A Orion, and Avro Shackleton
 AN/APS-21 search radar by Westinghouse Electric (1886) for part of AN/APQ-35 for Douglas F3D Skynight and Gloster Meteor NF
 AN/APS-23 search radar by Western Electric for Convair B-36 North American B-45C Tornado Boeing B-47E Stratojet B-50 Superfortress B-52 Stratofortress Lockheed C-130 Hercules and Boeing C-135 Stratolifter  part of AN/ASB-3
 AN/APS-24 radar set used with System 416L
 AN/APS-25 search radar for Grumman XF10F Jaguar
 AN/APS-27 search radar for Boeing B-52 Stratofortress Douglas RB-66 Destroyer Lockheed C-130 Hercules and Boeing C-135 Stratolifter
 AN/APS-28 search radar for Douglas F3D Skyknight
 AN/APS-29 search radar
 AN/APS-30 search radar for Grumman AF-2SGuardian
 AN/APS-31 search radar Westinghouse Electric (1886) for Martin P5M Marlin Martin PBM-3 Mariner Douglas A-1 Skyraider Lockheed P-2 Neptune  and Grumman AF-2S Guardian
 AN/APS-32 search radar for Guardian TBM-3 Avenger
 AN/APS-33 X band search radar for Grumman S-2F Tracker Martin P4M Mercator Lockheed P2V-6Neptune  ZPG-1W and ZPK
 AN/APS-34 improved AN/APS-33
 AN/APS-35 search radar with IFF integrated, by Philco
 AN/APS-37 search radar
 AN/APS-38 search radar for Grumman S-2 Tracker
 AN/APS-42 weather radar by Bendix Corporation for Douglas C-54 Skymaster Boeing C-97 Stratofreighter Douglas C-118 Fairchild C-119 Flying Boxcar Lockheed C-121 Constellation Douglas C-124 Globemaster II Lockheed C-130 Hercules and Convair C-131 Samaritan
 AN/APS-44 search radar for Consolidated PB4Y-2 Privateer and Martin P5M Marlin
 AN/APS-45 height-finding radar by Texas Instruments for Lockheed EC-121 Warning Star
 AN/APS-46 interception radar for McDonnell F2H-2N Banshee
 AN/APS-48 experimental unattended (automatic) airborne radar
 AN/APS-49 rapid scan search radar by Hazeltine Corporation for ASW
 AN/APS-50 search radar; planned for Grumman F11F-1 Tiger
 AN/APS-54  tail warning radar by ITT Corporation for B-47 B-52 B-57 EB-66B
 AN/APS-57 X band interception radar by Western Electric for Venom NF.3 with British designation as AI-21
 AN/APS-59  search radar for Canadian CP-109
 AN/APS-61  airborne monopulse radar
 AN/APS-62  height finding radar for ZPG-2/3W
 AN/APS-63  airborne radar for B-66 and T-29
 AN/APS-64  search radar for RB-47 B-52 RB-66B/C
 AN/APS-67  search radar by Magnavox for F-8B
 AN/APS-69  height finding radar for P-2V-6
 AN/APS-70  early warning radar by General Electric for EC-121 Warning Star and P-2V-6
 AN/APS-73  podded version of the X band synthetic aperture radar by Goodyear Tire and Rubber Company for B-58 Hustler
 AN/APS-75  SABRE X band high resolution radar side-looking radar by General Electric for XB-70 Valkyrie
 AN/APS-76  search radar by Hazeltine Corporation for EC-121 Warning Star
 AN/APS-80  maritime surveillance radar by Texas Instruments for P5M Marlin and P-3A/B
 AN/APS-81  search radar for B-52 Stratofortress
 AN/APS-82  improved AN/APS-76 search radar by Hazeltine Corporation for EC-121 Warning Star
 AN/APS-84 QB-47 tracking radar
 AN/APS-85  side-looking radar by Motorola for RU-8D
 AN/APS-87  improved AN/APS-82 early warning radar
 AN/APS-88  maritime surveillance radar by Texas Instruments for P-2 Neptune and HU-16 Albatross
 AN/APS-91  early warning radar for E-2 Hawkeye
 AN/APS-94  improved AN/APS-85 side-looking radar by Motorola for P-2 Neptune P-3 Orion  and B-26 Marauder
 AN/APS-95  improved AN/APS-82 search radar by Hazeltine Corporation for EC-121 Warning Star
 AN/APS-96  improved AN/APS-91 by General Electric for E-2 Hawkeye
 AN/APS-103  height finding radar for EC-121 Warning Star
 AN/APS-104  bombing and navigational radar for B-52C/D
 AN/APS-107 AGM-78 Standard ARM missile control radar by Bendix Corporation for Wild Weasel
 AN/APS-108  airborne radar for B-52D
 AN/APS-111  improved AN/APS-96 ultra high frequency surveillance radar by General Electric for E-2 Hawkeye
 AN/APS-112  improved AN/APS-59 AWACS radar
 AN/APS-113  weather radar by Bendix Corporation for UH-1 and EC-47
 AN/APS-115  maritime surveillance radar with two radar antennas by Texas Instruments for P-3 Orion
 AN/APS-116  derivative of AN/APS-115 maritime surveillance radar with only one radar antenna by Texas Instruments for S-3A
 AN/APS-117 AGM-45 Shrike missile control radar for Wild Weasel
 AN/APS-118 AGM-78 Standard ARM missile control radar by IBM for Wild Weasel to replace AN/APS-107
 AN/APS-119  Weather radar for HC-130B
 AN/APS-120  improved AN/APS-111 ultra high frequency surveillance radar by General Electric for E-2 Hawkeye
 AN/APS-122  maritime surveillance radar for SH-2E
 AN/APS-123  maritime surveillance radar for S-2D
 AN/APS-124  maritime surveillance radar by Texas Instruments for SH-60 Seahawk
 AN/APS-125  improved AN/APS-120 pulse-Doppler ultra high frequency surveillance radar by General Electric for E-2 Hawkeye
 AN/APS-126  surface search radar for the patrol version of P-3 Orion
 AN/APS-127  derivative of AN/APS-124 maritime surveillance radar by Texas Instruments for fix wing aircraft HU-25A/B
 AN/APS-128  Multi-Mode X-Band Maritime Surveillance Radar by Telephonics for various fixed and rotary-winged aircraft
 AN/APS-130  modified AN/APQ-156 for EA-6B Prowler
 AN/APS-131  improved AN/APS-94 side-looking radar by Motorola for HC-130 and HU-25
 AN/APS-133  color weather radar, for the EA-6A C-5 KC-10 C-17 EC-24A VC-25 C-130 C-141 E-3 E-4 E-6 E-8
 AN/APS-134  improved AN/APS-115 maritime surveillance radar Texas Instruments for P-3C
 AN/APS-135  improved AN/APS-131 side-looking radar by Motorola for HC-130
 AN/APS-136 I band MTI (Moving Targets Indication) radar for EH-60C
 AN/APS-137  improved AN/APS-116 maritime surveillance radar Texas Instruments for P-3 Orion, HC-130 and S-3B
 AN/APS-138  improved AN/APS-125 pulse-Doppler ultra high frequency surveillance radar by General Electric for E-2 Hawkeye
 AN/APS-139  improved AN/APS-138 pulse-Doppler ultra high frequency surveillance radar by General Electric for E-2 Hawkeye
 AN/APS-140  USA designation for AN/APS-504 maritime surveillance radar by Litton Canada
 AN/APS-141  USA designation for AN/APS-504(V)3 maritime surveillance radar by Litton Canada
 AN/APS-143  improved AN/APS-128 Multi-Mode X-Band Ocean Eye Maritime Surveillance Radar by Telephonics for S-70B Seahawk HU-25 HC-144A
 AN/APS-144 Ku band surveillance radar by AIL for RQ-5 Hunter and EO-5
 AN/APS-145  improved AN/APS-139 pulse-Doppler ultra high frequency surveillance radar by General Electric for E-2 Hawkeye
 AN/APS-146  Derivative of AN/APS-130 for the cancelled EA-6B Prowler upgrade
 AN/APS-147  improved AN/APS-143 Multi-Mode X-Band Maritime Surveillance Radar with Integrated IFF Interrogator by Telephonics for MH-60R Seahawk
 AN/APS-148  Sea Vue light weight maritime / land surveillance radar by Raytheon
 AN/APS-149  Littoral Surveillance Radar System (LSRS) developed by Raytheon for P-3C to replace earlier AN/APS-135/137.
 AN/APS-150  Military designation for Honeywell RDR-4000M weather radar, used on C-17
 AN/APS-153  improved AN/APS-147 Multi-Mode Radar with Automatic Radar Periscope Detection and Discrimination (ARPDD) & Integrated Mode 5 IFF Interrogator by Telephonics for MH-60R Seahawk

AN/APY Series
 AN/APY-1  for the E-3A,B AWACS surveillance aircraft, developed by Westinghouse
 AN/APY-2  for the E-3C (Maritime Receiver) AWACS surveillance aircraft, developed by Westinghouse
 AN/APY-3  for the E-8C aircraft, developed by Norden Systems division of Northrop Grumman
 AN/APY-6  multi-mode high resolution surveillance radar by Northrop Grumman for United States Naval Research Laboratory NP-3C
 AN/APY-7  solid state version of AN/APY-3 under development for E-8C
 AN/APY-8 synthetic aperture radar by Sandia National Laboratories for General Atomics MQ-9 Reaper  nicknamed as lynx
 AN/APY-9 ultra high frequency surveillance radar under development by Lockheed Martin for E-2D
 AN/APY-10  A much-modernized evolutionary development of the Raytheon APS-149 maritime surveillance radar by Raytheon for P-8 Poseidon
 AN/APY-11 US designation for Elta EL/M-2022 maritime, littoral and surveillance radar jointly produced by ITT Exelis to support the United States Coast Guard's Long Range Surveillance HC-130J aircraft.
 AN/APY-12  Phoenix Eye synthetic aperture radar surveillance radar developed by Lockheed Martin

AN/AWG Series
 AN/AWG-3  for the F8U-2
 AN/AWG-4  for the F8U-2N
 AN/AWG-6  used in conjunction with AN/APG-30
 AN/AWG-7  for F8U-3
 AN/AWG-9  for the F-14 Tomcat
 AN/AWG-10  for F-4J
 AN/AWG-11  for F-4K
 AN/AWG-12  for F-4M
 AN/AWG-13  for AC-119, used in conjunction with AN/APN-147, AN/APQ-133 and AN/APQ-136 radars
 AN/AWG-14  for F-4 Phantom II upgrade
 AN/AWG-15  developed by Fairchild for F-14B
 AN/AWG-16  two way data link for AGM-62 Walleye
 AN/AWG-19 Harpoon Aircraft Command and Launch fire control set
 AN/AWG-20  for F-15 Eagle
 AN/AWG-21  fire control system for AGM-78
 AN/AWG-24  Development of AN/AWG-6 for T-2
 AN/AWG-25  fire control system for AGM-78
 AN/AWG-27  for F-15 Eagle
 AN/AWG-30  fire control system for AC-130 used in conjunction AN/APQ-180
 AN/AWG-31  fire control system for A-10
 AN/AWG-32  fire control system for Maverick Plus System S-3

Other
 SCR-584 radar
 ASARS-2  for the U-2R reconnaissance aircraft
 Multi-Platform Radar Technology Insertion Program  or MP-RTIP, under development for the E-10 MC2A and RQ-4 Global Hawk

Commercial/scientific
 Arecibo Observatory
 Millstone Hill
 HAARP
 WSR-57 weather radar
 WSR-74 weather radars
 WSR-88D NEXRAD weather radar

See also
 Signal Corps Radio  (SCR) radars
 Joint Electronics Type Designation System
 List of military electronics of the United States
 List of World War II electronic warfare equipment
 List of World War II British naval radar
 Electronics Technician

Notes

References

Routledge, Brig N. W.,  History of the Royal Regiment of Artillery: Anti-Aircraft Artillery 1914–55, London: Royal Artillery Institution/Brassey's, 1994, 
Sayer, Brig A. P.,  Army Radar, London: War Office, 1950.

External links
 "Operational Characteristics of Radar, Classified by Tactical Application", Naval Historical Center, 1 August 1943, Retrieved 26 March 2010

List
Radars, List of